Psagot Investment House is an Israeli investment firm. Controlled by Rani Zim since 2021, the firm manages assets and capital totalling $24 billion. Psagot is located on Ahad Ha'am Street in Tel Aviv, in close proximity to the Tel Aviv Stock Exchange.

History
Psagot Investment House was established in 2003 through the merger of Psagot Mutual Funds and Psagot Ofek, a portfolio management company founded by Gabriella Ravid in 1990. In 2005, subsequent to the Bachar Reform, Bank Leumi finalized the sale of Psagot to York Capital Management, a New York-based investment firm. York Capital sold its stake in the company (76%) to Apax Partners in 2010. At $576 million, the Apax takeover of Psagot was Israel's largest private equity deal in 2010.

Under the direction of Roy Vermus as CEO beginning in 2006, Psagot grew to become Israel's largest investment firm through a series of strategic fund acquisitions. It acquired a provident fund managing NIS20 billion in assets from Prisma Investment House Ltd. in 2009 and made its first major pension fund acquisition in 2010 after outbidding a competitor for control of the Histadrut Leumit fund, which managed NIS6 billion in assets. In addition, Vermus shut down Psagot's underwriting unit. Forbes Israel ranked Vermus the fourth most influential young Israeli in 2008.

Altshuler Shaham sold the company to Value Capital controlled by Rani Zim in 2021 for 405m shekels.

Management 

 Yaniv Bender – Chief Business Officer
 Daniel Levental – CEO Psagot Properties
 Eyal Goren – CEO Psagot Mutual Funds
 Yohan Kadoche – CEO Psagot Securities

Source:

ISA investigations 
In 2003, when Psagot was still owned by Bank Leumi, the Israel Securities Authority launched an investigation into the firm's dealings for suspected violations of the Regulation of Investment Advice and Investment Portfolio Management Law (1995). The investigation went on for a year and culminated in a raid of Psagot's offices and the taking in of the firm's executives for questioning in late 2004. The impetus for the investigation was a Psagot fund having raised NIS1.7 billion in a single day. Psagot founder and general manager Gabriella Ravid resigned along with her deputy in late 2006. In 2008 Bank Leumi agreed to pay a fine of NIS25 million as part of a plea bargain agreement.

In 2010 police arrested three senior Psagot employees on charges that they were involved in manipulating the prices of government and corporate bonds in order to redound greater profits to the firm and inflate their bonuses in the years 2007–2009. An investigation conducted by the ISA concluded with Psagot agreeing to pay a fine of NIS150 million as part of a plea bargain. Psagot CEO at the time, Roy Vermus, was subsequently compelled to resign from the firm after the Supreme Court rejected an appeal he filed against his forced ouster from the company.

See also 
Economy of Israel
Venture capital in Israel

References

External links 
 The Bachar Reform

Financial services companies established in 2003
Financial services companies of Israel
Investment companies of Israel
Insurance companies of Israel
Companies based in Tel Aviv